Rajeshwor Prasad Sah is a Nepalese politician. He is a member of Provincial Assembly of Madhesh Province from Nepali Congress. Sah, a resident of Bahudarmai, was elected via 2017 Nepalese provincial elections from Parsa 2(A).

Electoral history

2017 Nepalese provincial elections

References

Living people
1976 births
Madhesi people
21st-century Nepalese politicians
Members of the Provincial Assembly of Madhesh Province
Nepali Congress politicians from Madhesh Province